Opharus lehmanni is a moth of the family Erebidae. It was described by Walter Rothschild in 1910. It is found in Colombia.

References

Opharus
Moths described in 1910
Moths of South America